KRBH-LP (93.1 FM) is a high school radio station broadcasting Rock and Pop music format with music from the past 50 years. Licensed to Red Bluff, California, USA, the station serves the Red Bluff area.  The station is currently owned by Red Bluff Joint Union High School District.

References

External links
 

RBH-LP
RBH-LP
High school radio stations in the United States